A. Gnanasekar was elected to the Tamil Nadu Legislative Assembly from the Melmalayanur constituency in the 1996 elections. He was a candidate of the Dravida Munnetra Kazhagam (DMK) party.

References 

Year of birth missing
Possibly living people
Tamil Nadu MLAs 1996–2001
Dravida Munnetra Kazhagam politicians